Simon Jean Paul Sasha Adams (born 1966), known as Sacha Stone, is a British New Age influencer and conspiracy theory promoter. He is best known for marketing 5GBioShield, a fraudulent anti-radiation protection device. He is also known for founding The International Tribunal for Natural Justice, The New Earth Project and the New Earth Festival which he hosts at his private resort, Akasha New Earth Haven, in Ubud, Bali.

Early life 

Stone was born in Rhodesia. In the 1990s, he was the lead vocalist in the eponymously titled band Stone, which released one album, Cover The Sun, but did not achieve commercial success.

Activism

Stone launched the NewEarth Project, promoting "conscious living", in 2013. This led to the NewEarth Festival, launched in 2017, attended by 2,000. In 2018, he initiated the International Tribunal for Natural Justice, to promote awarenes of "natural justice".

Antisemitic claims 
Stone posits that humanity is ruled by elite "Hidden Masters", which he refers to as "the Illuminati", "the Babylonian blood-cult", the "Luciferians", and the "Sabbateans":Our holonomic reality can realistically be defined as a culture underpinned by generational satanism, ritual sacrifice, blood-economics and arch deception perpetrated by approximately 1 out of 10 people against an unwitting 9 out of 10. That is if any reasonable statistical analysis of contemporary satanism holds true.Stone blamed the world's current woes on "Sabbatian Zionist Lurian Kabbalists behind the veil," a formulation referring to followers of the 16th century Kabbalist Rabbi Isaac Luria and the 17th century mystic Shabtai Tzvi.

Anti-vaccine claims 

At the 2019 NewEarth Festival, curated by Stone in Bali, invited speakers included anti-vaccine activist Del Bigtree and US conspiracy theory author G. Edward Griffin.

Stone has stated that the COVID-19 vaccine is a conspiracy to implant a "nanochip" in the human body so that "the Beast" can "take control of their soul." Stone has stated that use of vaccines is misguided: "Anyone who rolls their sleeve up for a vaccine – or an RFID nanochip – is absolutely inviting the Beast to take control of their soul".

On 5 January 2021, Stone hosted an event titled "Focus on Fauci" with anti-vaccine activists Judy Mikovits, a discredited biochemist, and Robert F. Kennedy Jr., an American lawyer known for promoting misinformation about vaccines and radio-communication systems.

International Tribunal for Natural Justice 

Stone founded ITNJ (The International Tribunal For Natural Justice), an organisation which stages court-like hearings dedicated to applying the principle of "natural law" to matters of current affairs. ITNJ has featured a discredited individuals who have subsequently used it as a forum for making false or misleading statements.

ITNJ hearings are chaired by Sir John Walsh of Brannagh, a lawyer disbarred from his practice in Victoria, Australia who is a former chancellor of Greenwich University, an unaccredited university formerly of Norfolk Island, Victoria. 

Robert O. Young, an American naturopath, who was jailed for illegally practising medicine, claimed in a November 2019 ITNJ video that "Mandating vaccines is part of depopulation plan". In a widely circulated clip, Young makes unsubstantiated claims that Bill Gates wants to kill three billion people, that international health agencies are "using chemical warfare against all of us", that viruses are not real, that vaccines are poison, and that alkaline can be used to cure any ailment. The video went viral on social media, which were dismissed as false by numerous factcheck organisations

The ITNJ organised a hearing on child trafficking, with "chief counsel" Robert David Steele, a former CIA-agent. His opening speech supported Pizzagate conspiracy theory and suggested that Hillary Clinton's 2016 US presidential campaign team were Satanic paedophiles. 

Since 2020, ITNJ has spread conspiracy theories about the COVID-19 pandemic, including false claims that 5G technology helps the coronavirus spread. On 10 May 2020, ITNJ hosted a hearing which included testimony from discredited former doctor Andrew Wakefield and Sherri Tenpenny, an American anti-vaccination activist.

Claims about 5G 

Stone has promoted the hoax that 5G is associated with health risks. He produced 5G Apocalypse: The Extinction Event, an hour-long documentary film promoting the idea that 5G telephone networks are a military weapon disguised as a telephone system. The documentary introduced Mark Steele, whose claims comprise the bulk of its content. The hour-long documentary had over a million views before being removed from YouTube. 

At the documentary's launch, Stone sold access to the film for $10, which included a 10% discount on the Bauer 5GBioShield, a USB-stick which Stone marketed as being able to protect users from the harmful effects of 5G radiation. The USB stick was sold by Stone through an affiliate marketing network, but was later considered to be a scam by Trading Standards.

Arise USA Tour 
Stone was a guest speaker in Robert David Steele's Arise USA tour. He used this as a platform to alert his audience to a "wave of unprecedented evil" which he believed to be taking over America.

References 

1966 births
Living people
British conspiracy theorists
British anti-vaccination activists
5G conspiracy theorists
COVID-19 conspiracy theorists